Unbreakable   is the debut studio album by the Spanish hip-hop rapper Dareysteel. The album was released on March 2, 2016, and produced by Little Seconds Entertainment Spain. The album was featured on Charts in France Pure Charts in its first week of release.

Biography  
The songs were written by Dareysteel (born Solomon Paul Ojo )   and produced by Little Seconds Entertainment Spain.

Track listing

References

2016 debut albums
Dareysteel albums